Schools in South Australia may refer to:

Lists
List of schools in South Australia
List of Aboriginal and Anangu schools in South Australia
List of boarding schools in South Australia
List of boarding schools#South Australia
List of largest South Australian schools
List of schools offering the International Baccalaureate Diploma Programme#South Australia
List of schools offering the International Baccalaureate Primary Years Programme#South Australia
List of Special interest high schools in South Australia

Categories
:Category:Schools in South Australia
:Category:Boarding schools in South Australia
:Category:High schools in South Australia
:Category:Primary schools in South Australia
:Category:Private schools in South Australia
:Category:Public schools in South Australia
:Category:Special interest high schools in South Australia

See also
List of dental schools in Australia#South Australia
Independent Schools Sports Association (South Australia)
Independent Girls' Schools Sports Association (South Australia)
SACSA (South Australian Curriculum Standards and Accountability framework)
Technical and Further Education
List of Lutheran schools in Australia#South Australia
Junior School Heads Association of Australia#South Australia
Head of the River (Australia)#South Australia
SABRENet
South Australian Certificate of Education